The New Albanian Party of Labour was a communist party in Albania. It was legalized in 1998, as the third communist party to obtain legal recognition post-1991. It was led by radio journalist Agim Xheka.

On 5 June 1999 the party merged into the Party of United Communists of Albania.

Defunct political parties in Albania
Communist parties in Albania
Anti-revisionist organizations
Political parties disestablished in 1999
1999 disestablishments in Albania